
Gmina Piecki is a rural gmina (administrative district) in Mrągowo County, Warmian-Masurian Voivodeship, in northern Poland.

The gmina contains part of the protected area called Masurian Landscape Park.

Villages
Gmina Piecki contains the villages and settlements of Babięta, Bobrówko, Brejdyny, Chostka, Cierzpięty, Czaszkowo, Dłużec, Dobry Lasek, Gajne, Gant, Głogno, Goleń, Jakubowo, Jeleń, Kołowinek, Krawno, Krutyń, Krutyński Piecek, Krzywy Róg, Ławny Lasek, Łętowo, Lipowo, Machary, Mojtyny, Mostek, Nawiady, Nowe Kiełbonki, Nowy Zyzdrój, Ostrów Pieckowski, Piecki, Piersławek, Pilnik, Probark Mały, Prusinowo, Rosocha, Rostek, Rutkowo, Stare Kiełbonki, Świnie Oko, Szklarnia, Wólka Prusinowska, Żabieniec, Zakręt, Zgon, Zielony Lasek, Zyzdrojowa Wola and Zyzdrojowy Piecek.

Neighbouring gminas
Gmina Piecki is bordered by the gminas of Dźwierzuty, Mikołajki, Mrągowo, Ruciane-Nida, Sorkwity and Świętajno.

References

Polish official population figures 2006

Piecki
Mrągowo County

de:Piecki